Zhang Na (born 10 March 1984 in Zhangjiakou, Hebei) is a Chinese football player who competed for the national team in the 2008 Summer Olympics. Her position is that of midfielder.

Major performances
2008 Asian Cup - 2nd

References

http://2008teamchina.olympic.cn/index.php/personview/personsen/2717

1984 births
Living people
Chinese women's footballers
Footballers at the 2008 Summer Olympics
Olympic footballers of China
Sportspeople from Zhangjiakou
Footballers from Hebei
Footballers at the 2010 Asian Games
China women's international footballers
Women's association football midfielders
Asian Games competitors for China